Rosalyn Fairbank and Candy Reynolds won in the final 6–4, 7–6 against Alycia Moulton and Paula Smith.

Seeds
Champion seeds are indicated in bold text while text in italics indicates the round in which those seeds were eliminated.

 Rosalyn Fairbank /  Candy Reynolds (champions)
 Alycia Moulton /  Paula Smith (final)
 Iva Budařová /  Marcela Skuherská (quarterfinals)
 Chris O'Neil /  Pam Whytcross (semifinals)

Draw

External links
 1983 Virginia Slims of Nashville Doubles Draw

Virginia Slims of Nashville
1983 Virginia Slims World Championship Series